Behram is a village in the Ayvacık District of Çanakkale Province in Turkey. Its population is 652 (2021). The ruins of Assos lie near the village.

References

Villages in Ayvacık District, Çanakkale